Red Road, Redroad or The Red Road may refer to:

Places
Red Road (Hawaii), Hawaii Route 137, a coastal highway on the island of Hawaii
Red Road (Kolkata), a boulevard in Kolkata, India
Red Road (Miami), a street in Miami, Florida
Red Road Flats, a housing estate in Glasgow built in the 1960s and demolished from 2010–2015

Art, entertainment, and media

Film
Red Road (film), a 2006 Scottish film by Andrea Arnold, set in Glasgow

Music
The Red Road Ensemble, musicians who played on Robbie Robertson's 1994 album, Music for The Native Americans
The Red Road (Bill Miller album)
The Red Road, one woman show and 2006 album by Arigon Starr

Radio
Redroad FM, a radio station in Kiveton Park, Sheffield, England

Television
The Red Road (TV series), a 2014 drama that airs on SundanceTV

Other uses

 The red road, a modern metaphor for a spiritual path inspired by Native American religions

See also
 Red Brick Road, London advertising agency
 Red Brick Roads, a block in Pullman, Washington, USA
 Red Dirt Road, a country music album by Brooks & Dunn
 Red Dirt Road (song), a song on the album
 Red Rock Road, Nevada State Route 159
 Red Rock Scenic Road, Arizona State Route 179